The Cathedral Building (originally named the Federal Realty Building), built in 1914, was the first Gothic Revival style skyscraper west of the Mississippi River, located in Oakland, California.

Description and history 

It is also called the "Wedding Cake" for its appearance, which resembles New York's Flatiron Building. Its narrow, triangular form is a result of its location on Latham Square, where Telegraph Avenue branches off diagonally from Broadway. It was designed by architect Benjamin Geer McDougall. It was developed by Brog Properties, a Downtown Oakland development firm who renovated the building for mixed residential and commercial units.   In June 2015, the United Nations Foundation commissioned Bay Area street artist Zio Ziegler to create a mural on the Cathedral Building's north-facing wall. The mural commemorates the signing of the United Nations Charter in San Francisco, California on June 26, 1945.

The building was listed on the National Register of Historic Places on January 2, 1979.

The third floor of the Cathedral Building was the setting for Cassius's apartment in the Oakland-based Boots Riley film Sorry to Bother You.

References

External links
 Federal Realty Building on Archiplanet

Commercial buildings on the National Register of Historic Places in California
Commercial buildings completed in 1914
Gothic Revival skyscrapers
Gothic Revival architecture in California
National Register of Historic Places in Oakland, California
Skyscraper office buildings in Oakland, California
Triangular buildings